"Guren no Tsuki" (Crimson Moon) is Jun Shibata's 13th single. It was released on July 26, 2006 and peaked at #22.

Track listing
Guren no tsuki (紅蓮の月; Crimson Moon)
Ushirosugata (後ろ姿; Figure from Behind)

Charts

External links
https://web.archive.org/web/20161030094458/http://www.shibatajun.com/— Shibata Jun Official Website

2006 singles
Jun Shibata songs
2006 songs
Victor Entertainment singles